HMS Murray was a Royal Navy Admiralty M-class destroyer. Ordered before the outbreak of war, she was therefore the first of her class to enter operation during the early months of the First World War. She was also the first vessel of the Royal Navy to carry the name HMS Murray.

Construction and design
Murray was one of two Admiralty M-class destroyers ordered from Palmers Shipbuilding & Iron Company as part of the 1913–1914 Construction Programme for the Royal Navy. Murray was laid down at Palmers' Hebburn on Tyne shipyard on 4 December 1913, launched on 6 August 1914 and completed in December 1914, at a price of £115,260.

The ship's crew consisted of 80 officers and men. Armament consisted of three QF  Mk IV guns mounted on the ships centreline, and four 21 inch (533 mm) torpedo tubes in two twin mounts.

Service
The destroyer formed part of the Harwich Force from commissioning until 1917.  On 31 January 1915 Murray was one of seven M-class destroyers sent to Sheerness to escort minelaying operations at the east end of the English Channel by the minesweeper . Minelaying operations started on 4 February and continued to 16 February, although the M-class destroyers, including Murray, were relieved by destroyers of the 3rd Destroyer Flotilla on 9 February, allowing them to return to Harwich. Late in March Murray was involved in anti-submarine patrols off the Dutch coast. On 23 March 1915, Murray took part in an attempted raid by seaplanes from the seaplane carrier , escorted by the Harwich Force, against a radio station at Norddiech on the German North Sea coast. The attempt was abandoned due to heavy fog which caused the cruiser  and destroyer  to collide, badly damaging both ships. Murray helped to escort the damaged Undaunted back to HMNB Chatham for repair. In June–July 1915, the 10th Destroyer Flotilla, including Murray, as a result of German submarine activity in the English Channel and south-western approaches, was deployed in escorting troop transports through the south-west approaches.

On 23 August 1915, the Dover Patrol bombarded the German-held port of Zeebrugge, with Murray one of twelve destroyers from the Harwich Force attached to the Dover Patrol for this action. While at the time, the British believed that the bombardment was successful, in fact, little damage was done. On 30 October Murray took part in a sweep by the Harwich Force of the German Bight during which the Swedish steamer Osterland was stopped and sent to the Humber for investigation of a suspicious cargo of iron ore. On 8 November the Harwich Force was deployed in support of Operation DZ, where  and  laid 850 mines in the German Bight. On the return journey, the destroyer  had her stern blown off by a German mine off Orfordness on the evening of 9 November and was taken under tow by Murray until relieved by a light cruiser from Harwich.

On the morning of 21 February 1916, Murray left Harwich as part of the Harwich Force to cover minesweeping operations in the North Sea. Later that day she collided with the destroyer , receiving sufficient damage that she had to be sent to Chatham for repair. (This operation was plagued with accidents – the destroyers  and  had collided on leaving Harwich on the afternoon of 20 February, while the leader  had run aground when leaving harbour on the morning of 21 February.) Murray took part in another attempted raid by seaplanes on 24–25 March 1916, this time launched by  against a German Zeppelin base believed to be at Hoyer in Schleswig-Holstein. Most of the Harwich Force was deployed as escort for Vindex. Only two out of five seaplanes dispatched returned, reporting that the Zeppelin base was in fact at Tondern, but that they were unable to attack the base. Tyrwhitt sent 10 of his destroyers, including Murray to search for the missing seaplanes. No sign of the missing seaplanes was found (they had ditched due to engine trouble, and their crews captured by the Germans) but the force encountered two German patrol boats (Braunschweig and Otto Rudolf) which they sank. When picking up survivors from the two patrol boats,  rammed the destroyer . While damage to Laverock was confined to her bows, Medusa had been holed in her engine room and was taken in tow by the flotilla leader , but due to the severe weather, Medusa eventually had to be scuttled. During the return journey of Tyrwhitt's force, the cruisers  and  also collided, badly damaging Undaunted, shortly after Cleopatra rammed and sunk the German destroyer .

From 24 April 1916, the Dover Patrol carried out a large-scale operation off the Belgian coast to lay mines and nets, in an attempt to limit use of the ports of Ostend and Zeebrugge to German U-boats. Murray was one of twelve destroyers of the Harwich Force that took part in escorting the operations. The British destroyers came under heavy fire from German shore batteries. Murray was hit in the forecastle by a single 150 mm shell that failed to explode, while Melpomene was hit in the engine room and lost power. Milne attempted to take Melpomene under tow, but fouled her port propeller with the tow cable, so Medea went to assist with the tow. The three German torpedo boats then returned to attack the British ships, with Medea hit three times by German shells, but were driven off by 12-inch fire from the monitor . The minefield probably caused the loss of one U-Boat, although at the time it was thought that four or five German submarines had been sunk.

Murray transferred to the Sixth Destroyer Flotilla of the Dover Patrol on 5 June 1917. She collided with the British destroyer  on 14 January 1918. An investigation attributed the accident to an error in judgment by Vehement′s lieutenant in command.

While Admiral Roger Keyes, commander of the Dover Patrol, ordered the destroyers in The Downs to try to intercept the German ships, none of the defensive forces managed to interfere with the German attack, which sank one trawler and seven drifters while severely damaging a further one trawler, five drifters and one minesweeper. At the end of the war, Murray was in the process of transferring to the 21st Destroyer Flotilla based at Rosyth in Scotland. By February 1919, however, she was listed as having returned to the Sixth Flotilla.

By this time the M-class destroyers were worn-out, and by May 1919, Murray was in reserve at Portsmouth. She was sold to Ward for breaking up at their Briton Ferry works on 9 May 1921.

Notes

Citations

Bibliography
 
 

 

World War I destroyers of the United Kingdom
Ships built on the River Tyne
Admiralty M-class destroyers
1914 ships
Maritime incidents in 1918